Lance Corporal Richard Jones (born 21 September 1990) is a British magician and soldier, best known for winning the tenth series of Britain's Got Talent in 2016.

Richard also appeared in The Chase in 2016 failing to beat the Vixen for  £50,000 .

Biography
Jones was born in Leytonstone, London and grew up in Chigwell, Essex. He joined the British Army in 2010 and studied for one year in Twickenham at the Royal Military School of Music.

He spent three years with the band of the Parachute Regiment before being posted to the band of the Household Cavalry in 2014 as a mounted dutyman.

On 15 March 2016, he appeared as a contestant on ITV's The Chase.

On 11 June 2016, Lance Corporal Jones performed as a bandsman in the Trooping the Colour, as part of the 90th birthday celebrations of Her Majesty Queen Elizabeth II. He performed as a magician in the Royal Variety Performance at the Hammersmith Apollo in early December, in the presence of senior members of the British Royal Family. In April 2017, he had his own one-off show on ITV called Operation Magic.

Jones toured the UK with his Power of Imagination tour which began in Windsor in August 2017 and ended on the Isle of Wight in November 2017.

On 9 February 2018, it was confirmed that Jones would tour at Butlins holidays during half terms and summer holidays throughout 2018.

Jones competed in Britain's Got Talent: The Champions in 2019. He managed to reach the top 3 but failed to reach the finals after he finished second in the audience vote behind BGT 2014 finalist Darcy Oake.

References

Living people
Military personnel from London
Britain's Got Talent winners
British magicians
Royal Corps of Army Music soldiers
British Parachute Regiment soldiers
British Life Guards soldiers
English people of Welsh descent
1990 births
People from Leytonstone
Musicians from London
English trombonists
Male trombonists
People from Chigwell
People from the City of Chelmsford
21st-century trombonists